Glenwood High School is a public high school located in Glenwood, New South Wales, Australia. It opened in 2005 with 490 students across two grades, Year 7 and Year 8. As of 2022 it had 1500+ students across Years 7–12. Glenwood High School is a rich, diverse centre for learning, thriving in both academics and sports sectors alike. Recently, the NSW government granted funding for significant improvements and additions to the school such as a performing arts building, a new 3-storied maths staffroom and much more. Completion of the construction of these new facilities is projected for 2024.

Furthermore, Glenwood High School has continued to outperform other schools within the local catchment area as seen by its steadily increasing position in HSC rankings. In 2019, Glenwood High School was ranked 366 in NSW. In 2020, the school improved to 200, and then 201 in 2021. Currently, based on the 2022 HSC results, Glenwood High School was ranked 162 out of the 500+ secondary schools in NSW. This is a testament to the quality education standards of Glenwood High School.

Catchment area
The local drawing area for Glenwood High School is roughly bounded by south of Stanhope Parkway to Perfection Ave/Newberry Ave to Old Windsor Road, west of Old Windsor Road, north west of Sunnyholt Road to Canyon Drive, north east of Canyon Drive and Phoenix Avenue (including all the homes in those streets), west of Sentry Drive to the southern boundary of Parklea Correctional Centre to Sunnyholt Road, then to the M7, which forms the southern boundary to Old Windsor Road. 

As of 2021, Glenwood High School's catchment area is within the Glenwood/Parklea area.

References 

Trend of Glenwood High School by HSC results (bettereducation.com.au)

Public high schools in Sydney
2005 establishments in Australia
Educational institutions established in 2005